This is a list of the 109 cartoons of the Popeye the Sailor film series, produced from the beginning of the series in 1933 to 1942 by Fleischer Studios for Paramount Pictures.

During the course of production in 1941, Paramount assumed control of the Fleischer studio, removing founders Max and Dave Fleischer from control of the studio and renaming the organization Famous Studios by 1942. Popeye cartoons continued production under Famous Studios following 1942's Baby Wants a Bottleship.

All cartoons are one reel (6 to 10 minutes long) and in black and white, except for the three Popeye Color Specials (Popeye the Sailor Meets Sindbad the Sailor from 1936, Popeye the Sailor Meets Ali Baba's Forty Thieves from 1937, and Aladdin and His Wonderful Lamp from 1939), which are two reels (15 to 20 minutes long) and in Technicolor.

Dave Fleischer was the credited director on every cartoon produced by Fleischer Studios. Fleischer's actual duties were those of a film producer and creative supervisor, with the head animators doing much of the work assigned to animation directors in other studios. The head animator is the first animator listed. Credited animators are therefore listed for each short.

Short films

Other appearances 
Popeye also appeared in a 1934 short titled Let's Sing with Popeye which had recycled footage from the first Popeye cartoon and had no plot other than to allow the audience to sing along with Popeye via a bouncing ball. This film was made for theaters that participated in Paramount's weekly Popeye Fan Club meetings.

References

External links 
 

Film series introduced in 1933
Popeye the Sailor (Fleischer Studios)